Fred N. Comdohr was a member of the Wisconsin State Assembly in 1883. Additionally, he was an alderman of Milwaukee, Wisconsin from 1878 to 1881. He was a Republican. Comdohr was born on April 22, 1839, in what is now Schleswig-Holstein, Germany.

References

German emigrants to the United States
Republican Party members of the Wisconsin State Assembly
Milwaukee Common Council members
1839 births
Year of death missing